Colin Bruce Spratling (23 April 1918 – 9 May 2006) was an Australian rules footballer who played with North Melbourne in the Victorian Football League (VFL).

Notes

External links 

1918 births
2006 deaths
Australian rules footballers from Victoria (Australia)
North Melbourne Football Club players